Margetson is a surname. Notable people with the surname include:

Arthur Margetson (1887–1951), British stage and film actor
James Margetson (1600–1678), English churchman, Church of Ireland Archbishop of Armagh from 1663
John Margetson, KCMG (1927–2020), British ambassador to Vietnam, the United Nations, and the Netherlands
Martyn Margetson (born 1971), Welsh former professional footballer and Wales international
Philip Margetson KCVO MC QPM (1894–1985), assistant commissioner of the London Metropolitan Police
Stella Margetson (1912–1992), English novelist and writer
William Henry Margetson (1861–1940), British painter and illustrator
William James Margetson (1874–1946), Anglican priest in the first half of the twentieth century

See also
Margat
Margit
Margot
Margret (disambiguation)
Margut